Meandro del Say is a wetland, part of the wetlands of Bogotá. It spans the locality Fontibón of Bogotá and the eastern part of Mosquera, Cundinamarca. The Avenida Centenario borders the wetland in the northeast. Meandro de Say is situated in the Fucha River basin.

Flora and fauna

Birds 
In Meandro del Say, 22 bird species have been registered. The wetland hosts among others the blue-winged teal (Anas discors), northern shoveler (Anas clypeata), masked duck (Nomonyx dominicus) and spot-flanked gallinule (Gallinula melanops bogotensis).

See also 

Biodiversity of Colombia, Bogotá savanna, Thomas van der Hammen Natural Reserve
Wetlands of Bogotá

References

Further reading

External links 
  Fundación Humedales de Bogotá
  Conozca los 15 humedales de Bogotá - El Tiempo

Wetlands of Bogotá
Geography of Cundinamarca Department